Point Hicks Lighthouse  is a lighthouse located on the Point Hicks headland, in the East Gippsland region of Victoria, Australia.

Location

History
The lighthouse was built on the point during 1887 and 1888 and commenced operation in 1890, built from concrete and with timber keepers quarters. It was connected to mains electricity in 1965, and then to solar power recently. The keepers' cottages are today let as holiday houses. At , it is the tallest lighthouse on Australia's mainland.

On 4 February 1971, the lighthouse and the headkeepers' and assistant keepers' quarters were listed as a place of regional significance on the precursor to the Victorian Heritage Register.

See also

 List of lighthouses in Australia
 Gabo Island Lighthouse
 Wilsons Promontory Lighthouse

References

Further reading 

Lighthouses completed in 1888
Lighthouses in Victoria (Australia)
Croajingolong National Park
Victorian Heritage Register
Shire of East Gippsland